Adscita mauretanica is a moth of the family Zygaenidae. It is found in Morocco and north-western Algeria

The length of the forewings is 8.5–13 mm for males and 8.5–12.3 mm for females. Adults are on wing from May at low altitudes up to August at high altitudes.

The larvae of subspecies A. m. mauretanica feed on Helianthemum species, while the larvae of subspecies A. m. wiegeli feed on Rumex acetosa atlanticus. Before overwintering, the larvae live as leaf miners. Pupation takes place in a cocoon at the ground.

Subspecies
Adscita mauretanica mauretanica (Middle Atlas, Rif Mountains of Morocco, north-western Algeria)
Adscita mauretanica wiegeli (Alberti, 1973) (High Atlas)

References

C. M. Naumann, W. G. Tremewan: The Western Palaearctic Zygaenidae. Apollo Books, Stenstrup 1999,

External links

 The Barcode of Life Data Systems (BOLD)

Procridinae
Moths described in 1932
Moths of Africa